The 1932–33 Torquay United F.C. season was Torquay United's sixth season in the Football League and their sixth consecutive season in Third Division South.  The season runs from 1 July 1932 to 30 June 1933.

Overview
After finishing in 19th place in their previous Third Division South campaign, it was clear that Torquay United needed to make major changes if they had any intentions of challenging for promotion to the Second Division.  However, believing the club lacked the ambition to do so, manager Frank Womack left Torquay at the end of the 1931–32 season.  His replacement was Frank Brown who had played for the Magpies in their non-League days and had subsequently become a trainer under Percy Mackrill and then Womack.  His first task was to rebuild the team, replacing stalwarts such as Bob Smith, Jack Butler and Laurie Millsom with newer, younger faces.  Of the team which lined up on the opening match of the season against Coventry City, eight out of the starting eleven were debutants, with new goalkeeper Percy Maggs and centre back Jack Tennant becoming ever-presents throughout the campaign, as was right half Ted Anderson who had joined the Magpies for the second half of the previous season.

While two draws and two defeats in their opening four games suggested the unfamiliar team had yet to find their feet, an 8–1 victory over Southend United at Plainmoor in early September certainly helped the squad to settle into the new season.  Torquay would prove to be particularly strong at home with only two defeats at Plainmoor throughout the entire season.  However, away from home it was a slightly different story with the team suffering twelve losses and only four victories on the road.  Nevertheless, by the penultimate game of the season, Torquay's excellent home form had propelled them up to 8th position in the table and a victory against Queens Park Rangers on the final day could have seen the club finish in an unprecedented 5th place.  As it was, a 1–1 draw at the White City Stadium and with other results going against them, the Magpies had to ultimately settle for 10th place, which was still the club's best finish in the League to date.

Inevitably, with a much improved side, the Torquay players began attracting attention from other clubs.  At the end of the season both Jack Tennant and Alf Gray were sold to First Division side Liverpool, while Ted Anderson was also lured away to Second Division West Ham United.  Perhaps most heartbreaking of all to the Plainmoor faithful was the departure of Dartmouth born right winger Ralph Birkett.  After 98 appearances and 20 goals for Torquay, the 20-year-old Birkett was sold to eventual First Division champions Arsenal, with manager Herbert Chapman willing to pay the significant amount of £1,588 to secure his services.  After later joining Middlesbrough, Birkett would go on to play for England in 1935.

Although losing such key players was a blow to the club, there was at least some hope for the future with the arrival of Don Welsh.  The talented young centre half would soon develop into another Torquay legend and gave reason enough for Frank Brown to confident for the coming season.

League statistics

Third Division South

Results summary

Results by round

Results

Third Division South

FA Cup

Club statistics

First team appearances

Source:

Top scorers

Source:

Transfers

In

Out

References

External links

Torquay United F.C.
Torquay United F.C. seasons